Andrea Grieco (born 5 October 1991) is an Italian football player. He currently plays for Aprilia, on loan from U.C. Sampdoria. His preferred position is right-back.

Grieco made his debut for the club on the match against Debrecen.

References

External links
 Profile on UEFA.com
 Profile on Sampdoria's official website
 http://aic.football.it/scheda/24912/grieco-andrea.htm

1991 births
Living people
Italian footballers
U.C. Sampdoria players
Serie A players
Association football defenders